The following is a list of Michigan islands in Lake Huron.  Lake Huron is the second largest of the Great Lakes (after Lake Superior).  With a surface area of 23,010 mi² (59,596 km²), it ranks as the third largest fresh water lake in the world.  Michigan is the only U.S. state to border Lake Huron, while the portion of the lake on the other side of the international border belongs to the Canadian province of Ontario.  For the islands belonging to Ontario, see the List of Ontario islands in Lake Huron.  This article also does not include islands that are part of the St. Marys River.

The vast majority of Michigan's islands in Lake Huron are centered on Drummond Island in the northernmost portion of the state's lake territory.  Drummond Island is the largest of Michigan's islands in Lake Huron and is the second largest Michigan island after Lake Superior's Isle Royale.  Another large group of islands is the Les Cheneaux Islands archipelago, which itself contains dozens of small islands.  Many of the lake's islands are very small and uninhabited.

As the most popular tourist destination in the state, Mackinac Island is the most well known of Lake Huron's islands.  Drummond Island is the most populous of Michigan's islands in Lake Huron, with a population of 992 at the 2000 census.  While Mackinac Island had a population of only 553, there are thousands more seasonal workers and tourists during the summer months.

See also
Harbor Island National Wildlife Refuge
List of islands of Michigan
Michigan Islands National Wildlife Refuge
Saginaw Bay

References
Michigan place names
Michigan municipality boundaries

Michigan
Islands